Grove Hill Municipal Airport  was a city-owned public-use airport located two nautical miles (3.7 km) southeast of the central business district of Grove Hill, a city in Clarke County, Alabama, United States. According to the FAA's National Plan of Integrated Airport Systems for 2009–2013, it was categorized as a general aviation facility. The airport has been permanently closed.

Facilities and aircraft 
It has one runway designated 13/31 with an asphalt surface measuring 2,704 by 75 feet (824 x 23 m).

For the 12-month period ending February 23, 2010, the airport had 2,490 general aviation aircraft operations, an average of 207 per month. At that time there were 6 aircraft based at this airport: 83% single-engine and 17% multi-engine.

References

External links 
 Coastal Gateway Regional Economic Development Authority
 Aerial image as of 20 January 1992 from USGS The National Map
 Airfield photos for 3A0 from Civil Air Patrol

Airports in Alabama
Transportation buildings and structures in Clarke County, Alabama